The Hi-Tech Crime Enquiry Cell is a special unit of the Kerala Police in Kerala, India, which began operations on 5 May 2006. It was formed to prevent, detect and defend serious and organized High Technology crimes. 

The unit is organized for the purpose to prevent, investigate, and prosecute computer and related crimes by working with other government agencies, the private sector, academic institutions, and foreign counterparts.

References

External links
Hi-Tech Crime Enquiry Cell 

Law enforcement in Kerala
Digital forensics organizations
Computer security organizations
Kerala Police
E-government in India
2006 establishments in Kerala
Government agencies established in 2006